Krisztián Nagy (born 20 June 1992) is a Hungarian football player who plays for Kisvárda.

Club career
On 16 June 2021, Nagy signed with Kisvárda.

Career statistics
.

References

External links
HLSZ

1992 births
Living people
Sportspeople from Baranya County
Hungarian footballers
Association football forwards
Budapest Honvéd FC players
Kazincbarcikai SC footballers
Kozármisleny SE footballers
Szentlőrinci SE footballers
FC Ajka players
Kisvárda FC players
Nemzeti Bajnokság I players
Nemzeti Bajnokság II players